Jadea Kelly is a singer-songwriter from Whitby, Ontario, Canada.

Career
Kelly's 2008 debut album, Second Spring, was produced by Ross Hayes Citrullo and received the "best country" award at the 2008 Toronto Independent Music Awards. At the end of 2009 Jadea began touring and performed shows with Ramblin Jack Elliot, Melissa McClelland, Luke Doucet, Ariana Gillis, Catherine MacLellan, Justin Rutledge and Jack Marks. In 2010, she released the album Eastbound Platform, which she recorded with producer David Baxter. Her third album, Clover, was released in 2013.

She has guest-starred on album work by fellow Whitby musicians Protest the Hero, most recent of which being Volition.

At the 12th Canadian Folk Music Awards in 2016, Kelly won the award for Contemporary Singer of the Year for her album Love & Lust.

Discography

Albums
Second Spring (2008)
Eastbound Platform (2010)
Clover (2013)
Love & Lust (2016)
Roses (2022)

Singles and EPs
It's Better To Be With You (2003)
Down Wave (2006)
Met While Incarcerated (2019)

References

External links 
 
 

Canadian folk singer-songwriters
Living people
Year of birth missing (living people)
Musicians from Ontario
Canadian women singer-songwriters
People from Whitby, Ontario
Canadian Folk Music Award winners